Jin Taraqayah (also Romanized as Jīn Ţarāqayah, Jīn Ţarāqayeh, and Jīn Ţarā Qayeh; also known as Chanchirāgheh, Chand Cherāgheh, and Jen Ţarāqayeh) is a village in Ali Sadr Rural District, Gol Tappeh District, Kabudarahang County, Hamadan Province, Iran. At the 2006 census, its population was 312, in 70 families.

References 

Populated places in Kabudarahang County